is a 11.2 km railway line owned by the Mizushima Rinkai Railway, serving Kurashiki, Okayama Prefecture, Japan. The line branches southward from the San'yō Main Line, owned by JR West, at Kurashiki-shi Station, ending in the industrial district of Mizushima. 

Originally an industrial railway for the military in Mizushima, passenger services began in 1948. The line switched hands three times before being owned and operated by the Mizushima Rinkai Railway.

Operations
The line is not electrified and is single-tracked for the entire line, with passing loops at Nishitomii, Yayoi, and Mizushima stations. 

Passenger rail services begin at Kurashiki-shi and terminate in Mizushima, except during rush hour and a few during the day, when it terminates in Mitsubishi-jikō-mae. Trains arrive roughly every 20 minutes.

Stations

References

Mizushima Rinkai Railway Mizushima Main Line
Railway lines in Japan
Rail transport in Okayama Prefecture
Railway lines opened in 1943
Japanese third-sector railway lines